Stratford is an unincorporated community in Delaware County, in the U.S. state of Ohio.

History
Stratford was platted in 1850. The community derives its name from Stratford-upon-Avon, England.  A post office was established at Stratford in 1850, and remained in operation until 1900.

References

Unincorporated communities in Delaware County, Ohio
Unincorporated communities in Ohio